Anzhelika Gavrilova (born 14 April 1978) is a Kazakhstani speed skater. She competed in two events at the 2002 Winter Olympics.

References

1978 births
Living people
Kazakhstani female speed skaters
Olympic speed skaters of Kazakhstan
Speed skaters at the 2002 Winter Olympics
Sportspeople from Astana
Speed skaters at the 2003 Asian Winter Games
Speed skaters at the 2007 Asian Winter Games
21st-century Kazakhstani women